Chambatan-e Olya (also Romanized as Chambaţān-e ‘Olyā; also known as Chambaţān-e Bālā) is a village in Cham Chamal Rural District, Bisotun District, Harsin County, Kermanshah Province, Iran. At the 2006 census, its population was 483, in 117 families.

References 

Populated places in Harsin County